Twilight Sentinel is a device on General Motors cars that senses outside light and turns the exterior lights on and off depending on lighting conditions.

In addition, Twilight Sentinel also allows the driver to set a timer (located with the headlight switch) that delays shutting off the headlights for a specified time period, usually up to three minutes. The driver can park the vehicle, shut off the car's engine and exit the automobile after dark, then use the headlights to light the path inside, before shutting the headlights off automatically.

An electric photocell located in the dashboard detects the environmental lighting conditions and activates the headlights as needed. Usually, this means turning on the headlights at dusk and shutting them off after sunrise. The system requires that a change in the environmental lighting conditions remains consistent for approximately 10 seconds before a change in the headlights is activated. For example, during daylight hours, the headlights would not turn on due to the momentary darkness of driving under a bridge or through a short tunnel. 

Twilight Sentinel can be disabled by switching off the feature or by manually turning on the headlights and earlier versions did not turn on the exterior lights for driving conditions such as heavy rain or fog, while later improvements to the system linked to GM's RainSense automatic windshield wiper system to turn lights on automatically when the wipers are on.

Twilight Sentinel was first offered exclusively on the 1964 Cadillac lineup but was expanded to other divisions later. 

A related feature offered on many General Motors models during the 1950s and 1960s was the Autronic Eye headlight dimming system. Cadillac later referred to its automatic dimming system as "Guidematic Headlamp Control" which encompassed Twilight Sentinel and Dimming Sentinel controls.

Ford Motor Company offers a nearly identical exterior lights on/off/delay shut-off system called "AutoLamp". The Ford automatic headlamp system could be had with automatic dimming on Lincoln models. Chrysler offered Twilight Sentinel on the Imperial from 1967 to 1975; other full-size C-body Chrysler products from the mid-sixties to the mid-seventies had it as an option as well.

Automotive technology tradenames
General Motors